Gulzar Singh Cheema (born August 11, 1954) is an Indian-born Canadian physician and politician. Cheema was a member of the Legislative Assembly of Manitoba from 1988 to 1993, and a member of the Legislative Assembly of British Columbia from 2001 to 2004, making him one of only a few Canadian politicians to sit in two provincial legislatures since Confederation. He is the first Indian-born person to be elected MLA in Canada. He was also a cabinet minister in the government of Premier of British Columbia Gordon Campbell from 2001 to 2004, and was a candidate of the Liberal Party of Canada in the federal election of 2004.

Education
The son of Ajinder Singh Cheema and Ajit Kaur Aulakh. he was born in village-Benagarh Jammu district in the [Jammu and kashmir] of India and received a bachelor's degree in medicine and surgery from Punjab University in 1977. In 1979, he married Harinder Claire daughter of Inderjit singh Claire and Baljit Claire   and moved to Canada. He interned at Memorial University of Newfoundland and was a resident at Saskatoon's University Hospital. He was a family physician in Winnipeg from 1984 to 1993.  In 1992, he was awarded the Canada 125 Medal for community service. To promote the health and welfare of the community, Cheema participates weekly on local multicultural radio talk shows and M Channel, a local multicultural television channel.

Cheema is practicing family medicine and is a clinical assistant professor for the Department of Family Practice at UBC as well as the medical director for iCON South Asian Division eHealth Strategy Office Faculty of Medicine, UBC. He lives in Surrey, British Columbia, with his wife and children.

Manitoba politics
In the Manitoba general election of 1988, Cheema was elected as a Liberal in the northeastern Winnipeg riding of Kildonan.  The Liberals went from one to twenty seats in the Manitoba legislature in this election, winning several Winnipeg seats from the governing New Democratic Party (NDP).  Cheema defeated Progressive Conservative candidate John Baluta by 585 votes, with NDP incumbent Marty Dolin finishing third.  The Progressive Conservatives came out of the election with a minority government, and Cheema became a member of the official opposition. Cheema increased his margin of victory in the 1990 provincial election when he ran in the new riding of The Maples, but the Liberal Party fell to seven seats and third-party status. During his time in the Manitoba assembly, he served as critic for health, labour, housing, native affairs, sport and co-operatives, and consumer and corporate affairs. He resigned his seat on June 17, 1993.

BC politics
Soon afterwards, he opened a family practice in Surrey, British Columbia.  Cheema became involved in several community activities in British Columbia, including acting as chair of the 1998 British Columbia Games for Athletes with Disabilities' medical section.

Although the British Columbia Liberal Party is usually regarded as significantly more right-wing than the Manitoba party, Cheema nevertheless ran as a BC Liberal in that province's 1996 provincial election.  He was unsuccessful, finishing 380 votes behind New Democratic Party candidate Ian Waddell in Vancouver-Fraserview.

The BC New Democrats experienced a sharp decline in their popularity between 1996 and 2001, and the provincial Liberals were elected in a landslide in that year's provincial election. Cheema had no difficulty being elected in Surrey-Panorama Ridge, defeating NDP candidate Bruce Ralston by over 6,000 votes.  On June 5, 2001, he was appointed Minister of State for Mental Health Services.  On January 20, 2004, he was appointed Minister of State for Immigration and Multicultural Services.

Federal politics
Later in 2004, Cheema sought and won the federal Liberal nomination in the new riding of Fleetwood—Port Kells.  He was removed from cabinet hours after submitting his nomination papers, and subsequently resigned as a provincial Member of the Legislative Assembly (Canadian politicians seeking federal office are usually required to step down from their provincial responsibilities.)  In a relatively close three-way race, Cheema was defeated by Conservative candidate Nina Grewal, 14,052 votes to 11,568 (New Democratic Party candidate Barry Bell received 10,976 votes).

Election results

References

1954 births
Living people
Canadian general practitioners
British Columbia Liberal Party MLAs
Canadian politicians of Indian descent
Canadian Sikhs
Indian emigrants to Canada
Indian Sikhs
Candidates in the 2004 Canadian federal election
Manitoba Liberal Party MLAs
Members of the Executive Council of British Columbia
Memorial University of Newfoundland alumni
People from Surrey, British Columbia
Punjabi people
Academic staff of the University of British Columbia
Liberal Party of Canada candidates for the Canadian House of Commons
21st-century Canadian politicians
21st-century Canadian physicians